Calosoma striatulum is a species of ground beetle in the subfamily of Carabinae. It was described by Louis Alexandre Auguste Chevrolat in 1835.

References

striatulum
Beetles described in 1835